Złota Góra  is a settlement in the administrative district of Gmina Kartuzy, within Kartuzy County, Pomeranian Voivodeship, in northern Poland.

For details of the history of the region, see History of Pomerania.

There is here every year Strawberry-Picking Festival. In the early 1970s, it was decided that, given the abundance of strawberries, a Strawberry-Picking Festival should be organised. This is an open-air event which takes place every year on the first Sunday in July. The Strawberry-Picking Festival is the big event in Kashubia, with visitor numbers in the tens of thousands, increasing every year. The fact that nearly two tonnes of strawberries were sold in a single day in 2005 also bears testimony to the popularity of this festival.
The reputation of ‘truskawka kaszubska’ or ‘kaszëbskô malëna’ is confirmed by numerous articles and pieces of evidence demonstrating that the product has become part of the culture and identity of the inhabitants of Kashubia. The local press publishes information vital to strawberry growers and comments at length on their efforts to join forces and take a common stand on the ‘truskawka kaszubska’ or ‘kaszëbskô malëna’, as well as to take action aimed at safeguarding the specific quality, smell and taste of these strawberries.

References

Villages in Kartuzy County